Lucifer yellow is a fluorescent dye used in cell biology.  The key property of Lucifer yellow is that it can be readily visualized in both living and fixed cells using a fluorescence microscope. Lucifer yellow was invented by Walter W. Stewart at the National Institutes of Health and patented in 1978.

Preparations 
For common usage it is compounded with carbohydrazide (CH) and prepared as a lithium salt. The CH group allows it to be covalently linked to surrounding biomolecules during aldehyde fixation.

Other cations such as ammonium or potassium can be used when lithium is undesirable, but the resulting salts are less soluble in water.

Lucifer yellow can also be compounded as a vinyl sulfone, with ethylenediamine, or with cadaverine.

References

External links
 Invitrogen's manual for Lucifer yellow
 Molecular structure and spectra of Lucifer yellow CH (lithium salt)

Fluorescent dyes
Hydrazides
Sulfonates
Heterocyclic compounds with 3 rings
Nitrogen heterocycles
Lithium compounds